Edward Blackadder (April 18, 1874 in Wolfville, Nova Scotia – October 22, 1922) was a Canadian politician, lecturer, physician and professor in Nova Scotia, Canada. He was elected to the House of Commons of Canada in 1921 as a Member of the Liberal Party to represent the riding of Halifax.

He was the son of William Blackadder and May Henderson and was educated at Acadia University and Dalhousie University. Blackadder practised medicine for two years in Westport, Nova Scotia and then for 15 years in Halifax. He was a professor of Medical Jurisprudence at Dalhousie University from 1908 to 1920. Blackadder was also an editorial writer for the Acadian Recorder in Halifax from 1907 to 1922 and published a book of sonnets in 1895. Before being elected, he was an unsuccessful candidate in the 1911 election. Blackadder died in office having served just 321 days.

Electoral history

References

External links
 

1874 births
1922 deaths
Liberal Party of Canada MPs
Members of the House of Commons of Canada from Nova Scotia